Oeneis polixenes, the Polixenes Arctic or Norique Alpin, is a species of butterfly in the subfamily Satyrinae. It has a Circumpolar distribution occurring in northern parts of North America the Arctic Urals, Kamtchatka, Yakutia, Chukchi Peninsula, and northern Siberia.

Description
The wingspan is 33–51 mm. The dorsal wings are dark grey brown, with orange patches near the wing margins. The upperside of the hindwings are a darker grey medially.

Distribution
O. polixenes occurs in northern Canada from coastal Newfoundland to the Yukon.

Subspecies
Listed alphabetically:
O. p. antonovae Lukhtanov, 1989 – northern Siberia (Gyda Peninsula, Taimyr Peninsula, Wrangel Island)
O. p. yukonensis Gibson, 1920 – south western Yukon
O. p. beringiana Kurentzov, 1970 – eastern Chukot Region
O. p. katahdin (Newcomb, 1901) – Maine (Mt. Katahdin)
O. p. luteus Troubridge & Parshall, 1988 – Manitoba, Alberta, British Columbia, Northwest Territories, Yukon, Alaska
O. p. peartiae (Edwards, 1897) – Baffin
O. p. polixenes – Labrador, Quebec
O. p. subhyalina (Curtis, 1835) – Arctic Canada
O. p. woodi Troubridge & Parshall, 1988 – Arctic coast (Yukon, Alaska)
O. p. yukonensis Gibson, 1920 – south western Yukon

Similar species
Philip's Arctic (O. rosovi)
White-veined Arctic (O. bore)
Melissa Arctic (O. melissa)

References

Oeneis
Insects of the Arctic
Butterflies described in 1775
Taxa named by Johan Christian Fabricius